Parasiccia nebulosa is a moth of the subfamily Arctiinae. It was described by Wileman in 1914. It is found in Taiwan.

References

Lithosiini
Moths described in 1914